Gerald Cranston's Lady is a 1924 American silent drama film directed by Emmett J. Flynn and starring James Kirkwood, Alma Rubens, and Walter McGrail. It is based on the novel of the same title by Gilbert Frankau published the same year as the film was released.

Plot
As described in a review in a film magazine, wealthy Englishman Gerald Cranston (Kirkwood) makes a bargain with Lady Hermione (Rubens) to marry her. Love is not to enter into the affair as he is marrying for social prestige and she to secure financial independence for herself and young son. Gordon Ibbotsleigh (McGrail), who loves Hermione, goes on a venture to Africa which unknown to him Gerald finances. Before going, Gordon taunts Hermione with being a purchased woman and endeavors to make love to her. Hermione respects Gerald and is jealous of the way her little son loves him. So she goes to the country. Angela (De La Motte), her cousin who loves Gerald, makes love to him and uses all her powers to win him, even following him to Paris in an airplane. Hermione returns, realizing she has begun to love Gerald, but this is turned to disgust when she learns of his trip to Paris. She taunts him with it. Just then, a discontented mob from Gerald’s factories attacks him and he is badly beaten. Angela comes to Hermione and tells her that Gerald is true to her. When he is brought in the house helpless, Hermione, who has repulsed all of Gerald’s previous advances, tells him she loves him. She offers the entire fortune he has settled on her and the child in order to save him from threatened financial ruin.

Cast

Production
Gerald Cranston's Lady was filmed in London, England, by Fox Film. Although adopted from a novel in which a sexual theme was paramount, the film's plot was modified so that love and not passion was the dominating motivation in all situations except for a suspicion of infidelity during the Paris trip, which is afterwards proved to be groundless.

Preservation
With no prints of Gerald Cranston's Lady located in any film archives, it is a lost film.

References

Bibliography
 Kennedy, Matthew (2004). Edmund Goulding's Dark Victory: Hollywood's Genius Bad Boy. University of Wisconsin Press. 
 Solomon, Aubrey (2011). The Fox Film Corporation, 1915-1935: A History and Filmography. McFarland.

External links

1924 films
1924 drama films
Silent American drama films
Films directed by Emmett J. Flynn
American silent feature films
1920s English-language films
Fox Film films
Films set in London
Films set in England
American black-and-white films
1920s American films